Out of Site may refer to:
Out of Site, a 1966 film starring Robert Pine
"Out of Site", a song by Built to Spill from their 1997 album Perfect from Now On

See also
Out of Sight (disambiguation)